Viane is a commune in the Tarn department in southern France.

Geography
The river Gijou flows westward through the southern part of the commune and crosses the village.

See also
Communes of the Tarn department

References

Communes of Tarn (department)